Adrienn Varga (born 6 August 1980) is a Hungarian former artistic gymnast. She competed at the 1996 Summer Olympics. Varga won a gold medal on vault at the 1998 European Championships.

Eponymous skill
Varga has one eponymous skill listed in the Code of Points.

References

External links 
 
 

1980 births
Living people
Hungarian female artistic gymnasts
Gymnasts at the 1996 Summer Olympics
Olympic gymnasts of Hungary
People from Gyula
European champions in gymnastics
Sportspeople from Békés County
20th-century Hungarian women
21st-century Hungarian women